Jordens Herrar is a 2011 book by Swedish author Pelle Strindlund.

Background 
For a long time human beings considered the enslavement of other as something obvious. Thinkers, scientists and politicians argued that slavery was necessary, morally right and God created. The slave trade was creating jobs and lead to the slaves to have a better life. The few who initially protested were dismissed as ignorant, fanatical, emotional, and more.

Nowadays, our view of slavery is completely different. It is easy for us to the two hundred years' distance see hollowness of the old arguments in its defense. But today there are other forms of oppression, for which we are as blind as the old-time slavery supporters were for slavery?

Yes, it does, says Pelle Strindlund. The obvious parallel is the exploitation of animals. The Earth's masters, he compares the arguments for slavery in 1700 - and 1800s with them for today's animal oppression. He demonstrates the extensive and profound similarities in how the slaves and animals are handled, the oppression of both groups justified, and how those who criticize the exploitation fought.

The striking parallels confronts us in a tangible way with the question of the moral foundations for the exploitation of other living creatures.

External links
Jordens herrar at Karneval Förlag

2011 non-fiction books
Swedish non-fiction books
Books about animal rights